Robert John Love (December 28, 1917 – December 6, 1986) was a test pilot and fighter pilot. He married Bernice Baxter. Also was a United States Air Force flying ace during the Korean War, shooting down six MiG-15 jet aircraft in 1952. He was assigned to the 4th Fighter-Interceptor Wing's 335th Fighter-Interceptor Squadron.
In 1969 he was one of the pilots hired by the air force of El Salvador during the Soccer War between that country and Honduras, where he flew a P-51 Mustang.

See also
List of Korean War flying aces

References

Sources
 (1972 Arno Press edition)

 https://www.flightjournal.com/wp-content/uploads/2014/07/The-Soccer-War.pdf

1917 births
1986 deaths
American Korean War flying aces
Canadian expatriates in the United States
People from Grande Prairie
Recipients of the Distinguished Flying Cross (United States)
Recipients of the Silver Star
Royal Canadian Air Force personnel of World War II
United States Army Air Forces pilots of World War II
United States Air Force officers
Expatriates in El Salvador